In organic and organometallic chemistry, trisulfide is the functional group R-S-S-S-R.

Examples include:
 Diallyl trisulfide
 Dimethyl trisulfide
 Trisulfane (hydrogen trisulfide)

Some inorganic compounds are also named trisulfides to reflect their stoichiometry.

Examples include:

 Antimony trisulfide
 Arsenic trisulfide
 Bismuth trisulfide
 Dibismuth trisulfide
 Diboron trisulfide
 Diiron trisulfide
 Molybdenum trisulfide
 Phosphorus trisulfide

See also 
 Chalcogenide
 Triselenide
 Disulfide
 Polysulfide